Events in the year 2013 in Bulgaria.

Incumbents 

 President: Rosen Plevneliev
 Prime Minister: Boyko Borisov (from 2009 until 13 March), Marin Raykov (from 13 March to 29 May), Plamen Oresharski (from 29 May until 2014)

Events 

 20 February – A controversial referendum on whether to build a second Bulgarian nuclear plant is invalidated by low turnout.

References 

2010s in Bulgaria

2013 in Bulgaria
Years of the 21st century in Bulgaria
Bulgaria
Bulgaria